The Westmorland Institution is a Canadian federal corrections facility located in the village of Dorchester, New Brunswick.   It shares a property with Dorchester Penitentiary and Shepody Healing Centre.

History
It was opened in 1962 as a minimum security prison on a hill overlooking the Memramcook River valley.

References

External links

 Pénitencier de Westmorland  - Correctional Service of Canada

Correctional Service of Canada institutions
Buildings and structures in Westmorland County, New Brunswick
Prisons in New Brunswick
1962 establishments in New Brunswick